José Luis Gómez García (born 19 April 1940) is a Spanish film actor and director. He has appeared in 33 films since 1968. At the 1976 Cannes Film Festival, he won the award for Best Actor in the film Pascual Duarte. Gómez was elected to Seat Z of the Real Academia Española on 1 December 2011; he took up his seat on 26 January 2014.

Selected filmography
 Pascual Duarte (1976)
 In Memoriam (1977)
 Blindfolded Eyes (1978)
 Dedicatoria (1980)
 Rowing with the Wind (1988)
 Lights and Shadows (1988)
 Prince of Shadows (1991)
 The End of a Mystery (2003)
 Goya's Ghosts (2006)
 Los Abrazos Rotos (2009)
 The Skin I Live In (2011)
 El Mudo (2013)

References

External links

1940 births
Living people
Members of the Royal Spanish Academy
Spanish male film actors
People from Huelva
20th-century Spanish male actors
21st-century Spanish male actors
Cannes Film Festival Award for Best Actor winners